Helms Bluff is a prominent north-facing bluff  east of Mount Morning in Victoria Land, Antarctica. It was mapped by the United States Geological Survey from ground surveys and Navy air photos, and was named by the Advisory Committee on Antarctic Names in 1963 for Lieutenant Commander Louis L. Helms, U.S. Navy, officer in charge of the Squadron VX-6 wintering-over detachment at McMurdo Station in 1961.

References

Cliffs of Victoria Land
Scott Coast